George E. Dickey (1840–1900) was an architect who worked in the United States and Canada in the 1800s.

Early life
George E. Dickey was born in Wilmot, New Hampshire, on October 29, 1840, to James and Sebra Sickey. He grew up and attended school in New Hampshire.

Career

Dickey went to Boston for professional training. He practiced architecture in Waltham, Massachusetts, and Manchester, New Hampshire, before moving to Toronto in 1873. After five years he moved to Houston.

Dickey designed many commercial and residential buildings during his career in Houston. His design of the B.A. Shepherd Building (1883) at 219 Main is an example of High Victorian Gothic according to architectural historian, Barrie Scardino Bradley. This building was at first home to the First National Bank of Houston, and was occupied by the Houston National Bank starting in 1886. This building was demolished in 1989 to make room for a parking garage. Another important Dickey commission was the Capitol Hotel built in 1883. The Capitol Hotel was planned for the site of the former Capitol building at the corner of Main Street and Texas Avenue, but with a larger building footprint and with five stories. For the Capitol Hotel, Dickey employed Renaissance Revival features, and incorporated modern infrastructure, including indoor plumbing, gas lighting, and an elevator.

Personal life
Dickey wedded Mary Messer of New London, New Hampshire, in 1862. He married Maria Watier, a native of Montreal. His third wife was Georgia Dickey. From these three marriages, he had a total of eight children. His eldest son practiced architecture with him.

References

Bibliography
 

19th-century American architects
1840 births
1900 deaths
Date of death missing
Place of death missing
People from Wilmot, New Hampshire
Architects from New Hampshire